Born to Ride may refer to:

 Born to Ride (Super Mario World), an episode of the TV series Super Mario World
 Born to Ride (film), a 1991 film directed by Graham Baker